The Notebook is a musical with music and lyrics by Ingrid Michaelson and a book by Bekah Brunstetter. The musical is based on the 1996 novel of the same name, written by Nicholas Sparks and was originally presented by the New York Stage and Film at the Powerhouse Theater at Vassar College in June 2019.

Plot overview
The musical takes place in the 1967, 1977, and 2021, in Coastal North Carolina.

Productions 
The Notebook was workshopped by the New York Stage and Film at the Powerhouse Theater at Vassar College on June 23, 2019. It was directed by Michael Greif.

In September 2022, the show had its "world premiere" at the Chicago Shakespeare Theater. The production featured direction by Michael Greif &  Schele Williams and choreography by Katie Spelman.

Characters and original cast

References 

New Bern, North Carolina
2019 musicals
Musicals based on novels